Gargi Bhattacharyya (born 1968) is a British sociologist. They are professor of sociology at the University of East London (UEL).

Life
Bhattacharyya's parents are from Bengal. Their younger sister is the playwright Sonali Bhattacharyya. They were a lecturer at Aston University and the University of Birmingham before coming to UEL in 2013.

Bhattacharyya is the Chair of the University and College Union (UCU) at UEL, and on UCU's black members standing committee. In November 2020 they found themself amongst several UEL academics threatened with redundancy. The MP Zarah Sultana expressed concern, particularly at the possibility that Bhattacharyya might have been targeted as a trade union organizer at UEL.

Mike Savage has called them "one of the leading academics on race", responsible for writing "what is probably the most important book on racial capitalism".

Works
 Tales of dark-skinned women: race, gender and global culture. London: UCL Press, 1998.
 Race and Power. London: Routledge, 2001
 Sexuality and Society; an introduction. London: Routledge, 2002.
 Traffick; the illicit movement of people and things. London: Pluto, 2005.
 Dangerous brown men : exploiting sex, violence and feminism in the war on terror. London: Zed Books, 2008.
 (ed.) Ethnicities and values in a changing world. Farnham: Ashgate, 2009.
 Crisis, austerity and everyday life: Living in a time of diminishing expectations. Palgrave Macmillan, 2015.
  Go Home? The politics of immigration controversies. Jones, H, Gunaratnam, Y, Bhattacharyya, G, Davies, W, Dhaliwal, S, Forkert, F, Jackson, E and Saltus, R. Manchester: MUP, 2017.
Also available as a free ebook at http://www.oapen.org/search?identifier=625583
 Rethinking racial capitalism: questions of reproduction and survival. London: Rowman and Littlefield, 2018.
 How media and conflicts make migrants. Kirsten Forkert, Federico Oliveri, Gargi Bhattacharyya and Janna Graham. Manchester: MUP, 2020.
 Empire's endgame: Racism and the British State, with Adam Elliott-Cooper, Sita Balani, Kerem Nisancioglu, Kojo Koram, Dalia Gebrial, Nadine El-Enany, Luke De Noronha. London: Pluto, 2021.

References

External links
 Gargi Bhattacharyya: Publications at the University of Birmingham
 Who's afraid of anticapitalism?, Left Book Club, https://www.youtube.com/watch?v=BLFLpXdIU3I&t=3382s
 Anticapitalism and love, Left Book Club, https://www.youtube.com/watch?v=lVg4fid5JPQ
 Social Reproduction and Racial Capitalism, talk at Queen Mary, University of London, https://www.youtube.com/watch?v=B3GTYHtXm_c&t=630s
 We, the heartbroken, https://www.plutobooks.com/blog/we-the-heartbroken/

1964 births
Living people
British sociologists
Academics of the University of East London
British trade unionists